Swyers Point is an ice-free point on the west side of Brown Peninsula, Scott Coast, that marks the north extent of Bellafronto Bight. Named by Advisory Committee on Antarctic Names (US-ACAN) (1999) after Lieutenant Commander Harry Merton Swyers, U.S. Navy, a public works officer at McMurdo Station in U.S. Navy Operation Deepfreeze 1976 and 1977.

Headlands of Victoria Land
Scott Coast